Emma Churchman Hewitt (Churchman; February 1, 1850 – 1921) was an American author and journalist. She served as associate editor of Ladies' Home Journal for four years; later of Home Magazine in Washington, D.C. and Leisure Hours in Philadelphia. She was also on staff at the Philadelphia (daily) Call. Later, Hewitt was engaged in general literature. She served as president of the Philadelphia Women's Press Association; and was the chairman of the commission on sanitation of the Philadelphia Civic Club. Hewitt was the author of Ease In Conversation, 1887; Hints to Ballad Singers, 18S9; The Little Denvers, 1902; and joint author of Queen of the Home, 1889. She made her residence at 4105 Chester Avenue, Philadelphia. Hewitt died in 1921.

Early life and education
Emma Churchman was born in New Orleans, Louisiana, February 1, 1850. Her parents were John and Lydia (Starr) Churchman. At three years of age, she moved north with her parents, who settled on a farm in Rahway, New Jersey, afterward moving to Burlington, New Jersey, and later to Camden, New Jersey, where she resided until she moved to West Philadelphia, Pennsylvania. She was a direct descendant of John Churchman, who was a prominent member of Friends.

Hewitt was a graduate of Miss Churchman's private school, in Philadelphia. She was a fluent French scholar, with a knowledge of several other modern languages. She began to write short stories at such an early age that it was said she was "born with a pen in her hand."

Career
In 1884, she became a journalist and engaged with the "Daily Evening Reporter" of Burlington, where she labored until its change of management. In 1885, at the solicitation of the publisher of the Ladies' Home Journal, she began a series of articles with the unique title "Scribbler's Letters to Gustavus Adolphus". The next year, she received a call from the same publisher to the associate-editorship of the journal, which position she filled for four years. Notwithstanding her work while occupying the editor's chair, she contributed regularly sketches, short stories and articles on domestic topics to at least a dozen other periodicals. Her "Kase in Conversation" first appeared in the Ladies' Home Journal under the title of "Mildred's Conversation Class." These articles were published in book form (Philadelphia, 1887), and the volume, entitled "Ease in Conversation," went into a third edition, and her "Hints to Ballad Singers" (Philadelphia, 1889) had an extended sale. Her chief literary work was the "Queen of Home," (Philadelphia, 1889) treating in an exhaustive and masterly manner subjects of household interest from attic to cellar. She contributed from time to time to the Philadelphia Press, the Christian-at-Work, the Sunday-School Times, the Weekly Wisconsin, the Housekeeper, the Ladies' Home Journal, Babyhood, the Home Guard, Golden Days, Our Girls and Boys, Our Young Men, Wide Awake, Munyoti's Illustrated World, Lippincott's Magazine, and a number of others.

She was a regular contributor to several English home magazines and completed a series of papers on household topics for a London periodical. After severing her connection with the Ladies' Home Journal, she accepted a position on the editorial staff of the Home Magazine, published in Washington, D.C., which she was obliged to resign on account of the death of her sister, which compelled her to live in Philadelphia. She then connected with Leisure Hours, a monthly publication in that city.

Personal life
She married Francis King Hewitt (1849–1898). They had a son and a daughter. She died in 1921, and was buried in Woodlands Cemetery, Philadelphia.

Selected works
 Hints to ballad singers ..., 1889
 Queen of home : her reign from infancy to age, from attic to cellar : twelve departments treating of home occupations, nursery, home training, home amusements, social relations, entertainments, library, dress, occupations for women : including papers by eminent authorities on home decorations, infancy, and the sick-room, 1889
 The three little Denvers, 1902
 Ease in conversation; or, hints to the ungrammatical, 1907
 Duryeas' cook book : one hundred and eighty excellent recipes showing the value of Duryeas' cornstarch in the making of thing good to eat, 1909
 How to Train Children, 1909
 How to live on a small income, 1909
 Karo cook book : being one hundred and twenty practical recipes for the use of Karo syrup, 1910
 What a cook ought to know about cornstarch, 1910

References

Attribution

External links
 
 

1850 births
1921 deaths
19th-century American writers
19th-century American women writers
20th-century American non-fiction writers
20th-century American women writers
People from New Orleans
American women journalists
Burials at The Woodlands Cemetery
People from Philadelphia
Wikipedia articles incorporating text from A Woman of the Century